The Highlands Natural Pool is a recreational outdoor swimming pool that is fed by stream water from the Wyanokie Highlands in the Norvin Green State Forest. The pool is located in Ringwood, New Jersey, United States. The pool is not chemically treated, contains aquatic life, and is surrounded by gardens, trees and plenty of shade. Annual memberships and daily visitors passes are available to the general public.

History 
In 1921, Camp Midvale was founded as a haven for working people seeking refuge, recreation, community, and nature by a group of outdoor enthusiasts called the Nature Friends (Naturfreunde). In 1935, Nature Friends volunteers carved the present swimming pool out of the hillside by hand. 

Ethical Culture members Walter and May Weis endowed money to the remaining developed part of the property in order to realize their dream of preserving land for the purpose of environmental education. Thus the Weis Ecology Center (WEC), a private, non-profit organization, was created to offer the public a unique opportunity to learn about the Northern New Jersey Highlands Region. 

The WEC was then taken over by the New Jersey Audubon Society who closed the pool in 1994. 

In 1995, New Jersey Audubon agreed to allow the community to open the pool and in 1996, The Community Association of the Highlands incorporated, reopening the site as the Highlands Natural Pool. In 1998, NJAS/WEC formally donated the pool to the community.

Operation 

The pool is generally open to the public on weekends from Memorial Day until July, daily through Labor Day, and on weekends in September. Annual memberships and daily visitor passes are available to the general public.

Lifeguards are on duty during pool hours. Amenities include a shower, changing rooms, restrooms, a picnic grove, and a small concession stand selling snacks and drinks.  Alcohol is prohibited on pool grounds. To help preserve the sense of nature surrounding the pool, no radios or amplified music are allowed.

See also
Norvin Green State Forest

External links
Highlands Natural Pool website
NJ Division of Parks and Forestry, Norvin Green State Forest
The New Weis Center for Education, Arts & Recreation
Ringwood Manor History
Snake Den Road, Local community web site.

Buildings and structures in Passaic County, New Jersey
Ringwood, New Jersey
Swimming venues in the United States
Tourist attractions in Passaic County, New Jersey
Swimming in New Jersey